Mastodon State Historic Site is a publicly owned,  archaeological and paleontological site with recreational features in Imperial, Missouri, maintained by the Missouri Department of Natural Resources, preserving the Kimmswick Bone Bed. Bones of mastodons and other now-extinct animals were first found here in the early 19th century. The area gained fame as one of the most extensive Pleistocene ice age deposits in the country and attracted scientific interest worldwide.

The site was purchased by the state in 1976 following an effort to preserve it from destruction with the construction of Interstate 55. Archaeological history was made at the site in 1979 when scientists excavated a stone spear point made by hunters of the Clovis culture (14,000–10,000 years ago) in direct association with mastodon bones. This was the first solid evidence of the coexistence of people and these giant prehistoric beasts. The Kimmswick Bone Bed was added to the National Register of Historic Places in 1980.

Activities and amenities
A museum tells the natural and cultural story of the oldest American Indian site one can visit in the state's park system. A full-size replica of a mastodon skeleton highlights the exhibits. A picnic area, hiking trails, and a special-use campground offer chances to explore the land where the lives of Native Americans and mastodons once intertwined.

References

External links

Mastodon State Historic Site Missouri Department of Natural Resources
Mastodon State Historic Site Map Missouri Department of Natural Resources

Pleistocene
Clovis sites
Cenozoic paleontological sites of North America
Archaeological sites in Missouri
Archaeological sites on the National Register of Historic Places in Missouri
Pre-Columbian archaeological sites
Missouri State Historic Sites
Natural history museums in Missouri
Museums in Jefferson County, Missouri
Protected areas established in 1980
Protected areas of Jefferson County, Missouri
Fossil museums
Paleontology in Missouri
National Register of Historic Places in Jefferson County, Missouri
Fossil parks in the United States
1976 establishments in Missouri
Tourist attractions in St. Louis
Buildings and structures in Jefferson County, Missouri